Conthyle or Konthyle was a deme of ancient Attica, originally of the phyle of Pandionis, but after 224/3 BCE of the phyle of Ptolemais, sending one delegate to the Athenian Boule. There was an association among Conthyle, Cytherus, and Erchia.

Its site is located southeast of modern Spata.

References

Populated places in ancient Attica
Former populated places in Greece
Demoi